Nahum Hofree is the former mayor of Ra'anana, Israel, and former principal of Ostrovsky High School in Ra'anana.

Living people
Mayors of Ra'anana
1952 births
Tel Aviv University alumni
Israeli aviators
Heads of schools in Israel